The 1984 PGA Championship was the 66th PGA Championship, held August 16–19 at Shoal Creek Golf and Country Club in Birmingham, Alabama. Lee Trevino shot four rounds in the 60s to win his second PGA Championship and sixth and final major title, four strokes ahead of runners-up Gary Player and Lanny Wadkins.

Trevino, age 44, was tied for the lead after two rounds at 137 (−7) with Player and Wadkins. Despite a double bogey at 18 on Saturday, Trevino carded a 67 (−5) for 204 (−12) and a one shot lead. A 69 on Sunday led to a total of 273 (−15), which set a new record for under-par by five strokes for the championship, which was later broken by Steve Elkington in 1995.

Shoal Creek hosted the PGA Championship again in 1990 and the Regions Tradition, a senior major championship, from 2011 through 2015.

Past champions in the field

Made the cut

Missed the cut 

Source:

Round summaries

First round
Thursday, August 16, 1984
Friday, August 17, 1984

Source:

Second round
Friday, August 17, 1984

Source:

Third round
Saturday, August 18, 1984

Source:

Final round
Sunday, August 19, 1984

Source:

Scorecard

Cumulative tournament scores, relative to par
Source:

References

External links
PGA.com – 1984 PGA Championship

PGA Championship
Golf in Alabama
Sports competitions in Birmingham, Alabama
PGA Championship
PGA Championship
PGA Championship
PGA Championship